"The K-Metal from Krypton" is an unpublished Superman story written by Jerry Siegel in 1940 and originally illustrated by the Joe Shuster Studio. The reason why National Comics (later to become DC Comics) never published the story is not known. This storyline features the precursor to Kryptonite called "K-Metal" and Lois learning that Clark Kent is Superman.

Like all Superman stories of the 1940s, the adventure originally had no title. The earliest known occurrence of the name "The K-Metal from Krypton" for the tale was in Gerard Jones' 2004 book Men of Tomorrow. The story remained forgotten and unknown from 1941 until 1988, when Jerry Siegel's original script and story outline was rediscovered in deep storage in the DC Comics library by Mark Waid.

Restoration
The surviving original story pages were worked on by Wayne Boring, Paul Cassidy, Dan Komisarow, Leo Nowak, and John Sikela. Artist Jon Bogdanove has agreed to contribute new artwork to the project. The comic was being restored, colored and published online, but was never completed. The website includes all completed pages. For uncompleted pages, scans of the original artwork or script page are also included. The restoration team is looking for any copies of the missing pages that they can find, and aim to replace any redrawn pages with restorations of originals if available.

References

External links
 Online restored comicbook
 Page 17 original Shuster Studio artwork discovered